Armenia was a merchant vessel launched at Calcutta in 1796. Captain Thomas Meek (or Meik), was her only captain. In 1799 the East India Company (EIC) took her up for a voyage to Britain. A French privateer captured her on her return voyage to India.

Early career
She made one trip to Britain for the EIC. Armenia arrived in Britain on 27 September.

Armenia was admitted to the Registry in Great Britain on 16 November 1799. Armenia appears in the 1800 issue of the Register of Shipping with T. Meek, master, and Walker, owner, and trade London−India.

Capture and postscript
The French privateer Clarisse captured Armenia on 5 July 1800 and sent her into Mauritius. Clarisse was armed with 16 guns and had a crew of 180 men under the command of Captain François-Thomas Le Même. Captain Meik resisted, but after about 40 minutes of exchanging fire he stuck. Armenia had lost her Third Officer killed and six men wounded, one of whom died later; Clarisse appeared to have had three men killed. Another report has Clarisses casualties as seven killed and 20 wounded.

Le Même took Captain Meik (or Meek), his second officer, and the crew on board the privateer. The four passengers, one of them a woman, and the wounded remained on Armenia and reached Mauritius on 17 July, where the French government provided good care. The passengers were then able to return to India in about a month later.

Meik and his crew were apparently left on the Seychelles. On 9 November, at about midnight, the boat ran into rocks in the Maldives. Five of the navy men, three of Armenias crew, and five Frenchmen died in an attempt to reach shore on a makeshift raft. The survivors took two Maldivian boats and set sail again. Meik arrived at Cochin on 4 December. Mr. Maddox, a midshipman from Lancaster, died of sickness on the passage. At the time of Meek's letter (6 January 1801) reporting his trials, the second boat, which also had some navy personnel aboard, had not been heard from.

On 20 July 1801, the members of the Bengal Phoenix Insurance Society presented Captain Meik with an elegant, engraved sword worth 1600 sicca rupees. Then on 24 September, the Calcutta Insurance Company voted a donation of £150 to the mother of Armenias Second Officer, £100 to the Steward, who distinguished himself in the action, and 500 sicca rupees to establish an annuity fund for the two seamen who suffered in the action.

Notes, citations and references
Notes

Citations

References
Anon. (1868) Selections from the Calcutta Gazettes of the Years 1798, 1799, 1800, 1801, 1802, 1803, 1804, and 1805, Showing the Political and Social Condition of the English in India Sixty Years Ago, Vol. 3.
 
 
 
 
 

1796 ships
Ships of the British East India Company
Captured ships
Age of Sail merchant ships
Merchant ships of the United Kingdom